Fath Union Sport, commonly called FUS or FUS Rabat, is a Moroccan professional football club based in Rabat and currently playing in the first division. The club was founded on 10 April 1946. 'Fath Union Sport' is the name of the sports club which encompasses everything from Basketball to the game of Chess.

History

Foundation
Fath Union Sport de Rabat was founded on 1946 when Morocco was under the French protectorate. The club is considered the heir of Union Sportive de Rabat-Salé, founded on 1932, which was the first nationalist club in Morocco according to the late Père Jégo, one of the Moroccan football historic symbols. This club was dissolved by the French authorities in 1944.

After the foundation of Fath Union Sport de Rabat. the French authorities refused its integration with the French National Football League under the pretext that it was a nationalist club.

Relationship with Prince Moulay Abdallah
Prince Moulay Abdallah was one of the biggest fans of FUS de Rabat and also the honorary president of the club, he supported the team financially and helped to attend many goals that are still entrenched in the memories of all Moroccan football fans.

The late prince used to come to the stadium to see the training session without being recognized and to organize friendly games to harden the club's players and make them more efficient.

Titles
Although Fath de Rabat is one of the historical clubs in Morocco, it has only 6 titles won in the Moroccan Throne Cup respectively in 1967, 1973, 1976, 1995, 2010 and 2014. The club won the first cup after defeating RS Settat by two goals scored by Fettah and Laroussi to one in Stade D'honneur. The second one was taken in the city of Agadir after the team beat Ittihad Khemisset (3–1).

In 1976, FUS de Rabat got the third cup by defeating KAC Kénitra in Stade de Marchan, the only goal of the final match was scored by Khalid Labied, who was later the shared top scorer of 1980 African Cup of Nations.

The fans of Rabat's team did not rejoice any title only after almost twenty years when they got another Throne Cup in 1995 at the expense of Olympique Khouribga. The final match was finished by the score of 2–0, the goals had been scored by Postnov and Hammou.
	
On 25 November 2010 FUS de Rabat won their last cup in Stade Moulay Abdellah after overthrowing the team of Maghreb Fez by the score of 2–1. Issoufou scored the first goal and the second was made by El Fatihi.

African Competitions
Since 2010, FUS de Rabat became one of five Moroccan teams that succeeded to have African titles after winning the 2010 CAF Confederation Cup, the club had also participated more than one time in African competitions.
	
After winning Moroccan Throne Cup in 1995 FUS de Rabat had participated in the African Cup Winners' Cup and succeeded to the quarter-final before being eliminated by Arab Contractors SC (0–1 on Aggregate). In that time Philippe Troussier was the coach of the team.

In 2002, The team participated in the CAF Cup and was eliminated from the second round by Satellite FC of Côte d'Ivoire. after a draw without goals in Morocco, they lost outside their ground by the score of 1–0.

Although it lost the final match of Moroccan Throne Cup in 2009 against neighbours AS FAR, the club had the opportunity to participate in the 2010 CAF Confederation Cup. FUS de Rabat managed to be the competition's surprise by disqualifying several famous teams and among them the defending champion Stade Malien after beating them in Rabat by the score of 2–0 and going to Bamako to have a draw (0–0). Rabat team would after that come in the top of Group B after having several good results against Zanaco, Haras El-Hodood and CS Sfaxien.
	
On 12 November 2010, FUS de Rabat was qualified for the first time to the final match of the competition although the team was defeated against Al-Ittihad of Libya by 1–0, because they did well outside in Tripoli by beating the home side by the score of 2–1 in June 11 Stadium.

The African title came on November 4, after making a draw 0–0 with CS Sfaxien one week before in Rabat, the team succeed to create the surprise in Sfax by beating the host team by the score of 3–2. Defender Boukhriss opened the score for FUS de Rabat but the hosts succeed to overturn the game in their favor after scoring two goals. In the 75th minute Mohamed Zouidi equalized the score and added the third goal in 89th minute while CS Sfaxien players were trying to score to take the title.

Honours
List of trophies won by the club
Botola
Winners (1) : 2016
Runner-up (5) : 1973, 1974, 1981, 2001, 2012
	
Coupe du Trône
1967, 1973, 1976, 1995, 2010, 2014	
Runner-up : 1960, 2009	, 2015	

GNF 2 Moroccan Championship
1962, 1998, 2007, 2009	

CAF Confederation Cup
2010

Performance in CAF competitions
CAF Champions League: 2 appearance
2013 – Second round
2017 – Second round
CAF Confederation Cup: 2 appearances
2010 – Champion
2011 – First Round of 16
2013 – Group stage (Top 8)
2015 – Second round
2016 – Semi-final 
2017 – Semi-final

CAF Cup: 1 appearance
2002 – Second Round

CAF Cup Winners' Cup: 1 appearance
1996 – Quarter-Final

CAF Super Cup: 1 appearance
2011 – Runner up

Current squad
As of 18 August 2022

Managers
 Léopold Anoul (1973-1974)
 Zaki Badou (1993–94)
 Philippe Troussier (1995–97)
 Ivica Todorov (1998–00)
 Yves Herbet (1999–03)
 François Bracci (2007)
 Rachid Taoussi (2007–08)
 Hassan Moumen (2008–??)
 Hussein Amotta (July 1, 2008 – June 24, 2011)
 Jamal Sellami (June 30, 2011 – May 8, 2014)
 Walid Regragui (May 8, 2014–)

References

External links

 

 
Football clubs in Morocco
1946 establishments in Morocco
Sports clubs in Morocco
Association football clubs established in 1946
CAF Confederation Cup winning clubs